Desmond Tachie-Mason (born May 1, 1984) is a Canadian soccer player, who is currently playing and working as coach for the Vancouver Metro Soccer League club West Van FC.

Career

College
Tachie played for the Vancouver Selects and attended Capilano College, who he led to the Canadian Colleges Championship in 2003, earning Canadian Colleges and British Columbia Colleges All-Star selections.

Professional
Tachie turned professional in 2004, playing with the Edmonton Aviators in the USL First Division, appearing in 13 games. Following a successful season with Ottawa Fury in the USL Premier Development League in 2005, during which scored 7 goals and 7 assists in 15 games, Tachie signed with the Toronto Lynx.

Tachie moved to Hungary in 2007 when he signed for Kaposvölgye VSC. He spent the next two seasons playing in the Hungarian league, scoring 7 goals in 33 appearances for Kaposvölgye, before returning to North America in 2009.

He trialed with Major League Soccer expansion club Seattle Sounders FC in the early months of 2009, and was a Sounders SuperSearch finalist, but was ultimately not offered a contract by the club, and returned to Canada.

He subsequently played with several Canadian amateur teams, including the Capilano Blues of the Vancouver Metro Soccer League and Athletic Club of BC of the Pacific Coast Soccer League, before signing with the Charlotte Eagles of the USL Second Division in 2010.

Tachie played for Aalborg BK in Denmark before moving back to Vancouver, British Columbia, Canada in 2013 where he is currently a staff coach at West Vancouver Soccer Club, and the assistant coach for Capilano University's men's team.

Personal
Tachie comes from Kumasi in Ghana. He emigrated to Canada in the mid 1990s.

References

External links
 Charlotte Eagles bio 
 Trialists Sounders Video

1984 births
Living people
Black Canadian soccer players
Soccer players from Vancouver
Canadian expatriate sportspeople in the United States
Canadian expatriate soccer players
Canadian soccer players
Expatriate soccer players in the United States
Association football midfielders
Canadian people of Ghanaian descent
Ottawa Fury (2005–2013) players
Canadian expatriate sportspeople in Hungary
Toronto Lynx players
Kaposvölgye VSC footballers
Charlotte Eagles players
Expatriate footballers in Hungary
USL League Two players
Canadian expatriate sportspeople in Denmark
USL First Division players
USL Second Division players
TSS FC Rovers players
Edmonton Aviators / F.C. players
Ghanaian expatriate sportspeople in Hungary
Capilano University alumni